Icoana is a commune in Olt County, Muntenia, Romania. It is composed of three villages: Floru, Icoana and Ursoaia.

References

Communes in Olt County
Localities in Muntenia